Claire Veronica Eagan (born October 9, 1950) is a Senior United States district judge of the United States District Court for the Northern District of Oklahoma and a former Judge of the United States Foreign Intelligence Surveillance Court. Effective February 12, 2020, Chief Justice John G. Roberts appointed Judge Eagan as the chair of the Executive Committee of the Judicial Conference.

Early life and education
Born in The Bronx, New York, Eagan graduated from Trinity Washington University with a Bachelor of Arts degree in 1972, and later from Fordham University School of Law with a Juris Doctor in 1976. At Fordham, Eagan was a commentary editor of the Fordham Law Review.

Career 
Eagan began her legal career working as a law clerk to Judge Allen E. Barrow of the United States District Court for the Northern District of Oklahoma from 1976 to 1978.  She went into private practice attorney at the Hall Estill law firm in Tulsa, Oklahoma from 1978 to 1998. She wrote an affidavit in support of April Rose Wilkens, whom she knew during her time as an attorney.

Federal judicial service 
Eagan served as a United States magistrate judge for the Northern District of Oklahoma from 1998 until 2001.
On the recommendation of Senators James Inhofe and Don Nickles, Eagan was nominated to the United States District Court for the Northern District of Oklahoma by President George W. Bush on September 4, 2001, to a seat vacated by Thomas Rutherford Brett. Eagan was confirmed by the Senate on October 23, 2001, on a Senate vote and received her commission the next day. Eagan served as the chief judge of the court from 2005 to 2012. Eagen assumed senior status on October 1, 2022. She worked with Larry Morris of the Oklahoma Pardon and Parole Board in 2011, before he was appointed to the board, to support at-risk youth.

Assignment to FISC 
In February 2013 she was appointed to the Foreign Intelligence Surveillance Court (FISC), established in 1978 per the Foreign Intelligence Surveillance Act. Her term expired May 18, 2019.

She was the author of the August 29, 2013, FISC opinion released on September 17, 2013, explaining that the call metadata collection program was constitutional, and thus "any decision about whether to keep it was a political question, not a legal one". The first FISC opinion written since the Snowden leaks (judges must reauthorize the program every 90 days and generally they are "brief reiterations of the court’s legal analysis"), the lengthy 29-page opinion is thought to have been written "for the purpose of public release". Eagan wrote "metadata that includes phone numbers, time and duration of calls is not protected by the Fourth Amendment, since the content of the calls is not accessed." In the opinion, Eagan said "data collection is authorized under Section 215 of the Patriot Act that allows the FBI to issue orders to produce tangible things if there are reasonable grounds to believe the records are relevant to a terrorism investigation." The opinion authorized the FBI to "collect the information for probes of 'unknown' as well as known terrorists." She also noted that no U.S. telecommunications company had legally refused to turn over customer metadata, "despite the mechanism for doing so".

Executive Committee of the Judicial Conference
Effective February 12, 2020, Chief Justice John G. Roberts appointed Judge Eagan as the chair of the Executive Committee of the Judicial Conference. The press notice, released by the U.S. District Court for the Northern District of Oklahoma, noted that Eagan had served on that committee since December, 2008, when she had been appointed to succeed Judge Merrick B. Garland on the U.S. Court of Appeals for the D.C. Circuit.

Notes

See also
List of first women lawyers and judges in Oklahoma

References

External links

1950 births
Living people
21st-century American judges
21st-century American women judges
Fordham University School of Law alumni
Judges of the United States District Court for the Northern District of Oklahoma
Judges of the United States Foreign Intelligence Surveillance Court
People from the Bronx
People from Tulsa, Oklahoma
Trinity Washington University alumni
United States district court judges appointed by George W. Bush
United States magistrate judges